Moengo Stadion is a football stadium in Moengo, Suriname.  It is the home stadium of football club S.V. Notch competing in the SVB Hoofdklasse. The stadium holds 2,000.

References

Football venues in Suriname
S.V. Notch